In calculus, the integral of the secant function can be evaluated using a variety of methods and there are multiple ways of expressing the antiderivative, all of which can be shown to be equivalent via trigonometric identities,

This formula is useful for evaluating various trigonometric integrals. In particular, it can be used to evaluate the integral of the secant  cubed, which, though seemingly special, comes up rather frequently in applications.

An alternative expression in terms of the inverse hyperbolic sine  is numerically well behaved for real arguments 

The integral of the secant function was historically one of the first integrals of its type ever evaluated, before most of the development of integral calculus. It is important because it is the vertical coordinate of the Mercator projection, used for marine navigation with constant compass bearing.

Proof that the different antiderivatives are equivalent

Trigonometric forms 
Three common expressions for the integral of the secant,

are equivalent because

Proof: we can separately apply the tangent half-angle substitution  to each of the three forms, and show them equivalent to the same expression in terms of  Under this substitution  and 

First, 

Second,

Third, using the tangent addition identity 

So all three expressions describe the same quantity.

Hyperbolic forms 
Let

Therefore,

History 

The integral of the secant function was one of the "outstanding open problems of the mid-seventeenth century", solved in 1668 by James Gregory. He applied his result to a problem concerning nautical tables. In 1599, Edward Wright evaluated the integral by numerical methods – what today we would call Riemann sums. He wanted the solution for the purposes of cartography – specifically for constructing an accurate Mercator projection. In the 1640s, Henry Bond, a teacher of navigation, surveying, and other mathematical topics, compared Wright's numerically computed table of values of the integral of the secant with a table of logarithms of the tangent function, and consequently conjectured that

This conjecture became widely known, and in 1665, Isaac Newton was aware of it.

Evaluations

By a standard substitution (Gregory's approach) 
This substitution can be obtained from the derivatives of secant and tangent added together, which have secant as a common factor.

Starting with

adding them gives

The integral is evaluated as follows:

 

as claimed. This was the formula discovered by James Gregory.

By partial fractions and a substitution (Barrow's approach)
Although Gregory proved the conjecture in 1668 in his Exercitationes Geometricae, the proof was presented in a form that renders it nearly impossible for modern readers to comprehend; Isaac Barrow, in his Lectiones Geometricae of 1670, gave the first "intelligible" proof, though even that was "couched in the geometric idiom of the day." Barrow's proof of the result was the earliest use of partial fractions in integration.  Adapted to modern notation, Barrow's proof began as follows:

Therefore,

as expected.

By the tangent half-angle substitution

Standard 
Under the tangent half-angle substitution 

Therefore the integral of the secant function is

as before.

Non-standard 
The integral can also be derived by using a somewhat non-standard version of the tangent half-angle substitution, which is simpler in the case of this particular integral, published in 2013, is as follows:

 
Substituting:

By two successive substitutions 

The integral can also be solved by manipulating the integrand and substituting twice. Using the definition  and the identity , the integral can be rewritten as

 

Substituting ,  reduces the integral to

 

 

The integral is now reduced to a simple integral, and back-substituting gives

which is one of the hyperbolic forms of the integral.

A similar strategy can be used to integrate the cosecant, hyperbolic secant, and hyperbolic cosecant functions.

Other hyperbolic forms 

It is also possible to find the other two hyperbolic forms directly, by again multiplying and dividing by a convenient term:

where  is the sign function.

Likewise:

Using complex exponential form 

Under the substitution 

So the integral can be solved as:

Because the constant of integration can be anything, the additional constant term can be absorbed into it. Finally, if theta is real-valued, we can indicate this with absolute value brackets in order to get the equation into its most familiar form:

Gudermannian and Lambertian

The integral of the hyperbolic secant function defines the Gudermannian function:

The integral of the secant function defines the Lambertian function, which is the inverse of the Gudermannian function:

These functions are encountered in the theory of map projections: the Mercator projection of a point on the sphere with longitude  and latitude  may be written as:

See also 

Integral of secant cubed

Notes

References 

 

Integral calculus